6 Hydrae is a single star in the equatorial constellation of Hydra, located 373 light-years away from the Sun. It has the Bayer designation a Hydrae; 6 Hydrae is the Flamsteed designation. This object is visible to the naked eye as a faint, orange-hued star with an apparent visual magnitude of 4.98. It is moving closer to the Earth with a heliocentric radial velocity of −8 km/s. Eggen (1995) listed it as a proper motion candidate for membership in the IC 2391 supercluster.

This is an aging giant star with a stellar classification of K3 III, which indicates it has exhausted the hydrogen at its core and evolved away from the main sequence. As a consequence, it has expanded to 33 times the radius of the Sun.

References

K-type giants
Hydra (constellation)
Hydrae, a
Durchmusterung objects
Hydrae, 06
073840
042509
3431